Harry Stuart Goodhart-Rendel  (1887 in Cambridge – 21 June 1959 in Westminster, London) was a British architect, writer and musician.

Life
Harry Stuart Goodhart was born on 29 May 1887 in Cambridge, England. He added the additional name Rendel by royal licence in 1902. He was educated at Eton College,  and read music at Trinity College, Cambridge. He worked briefly for Sir Charles Nicholson, and then set up his own architectural practice. He is known for his church projects.

He was Oxford's Slade Professor of Fine Art, from 1933 to 1936.
His 1934 lectures on Victorian architecture were considered important, as part of the informed revival of interest in Victoriana, by Nikolaus Pevsner. He served as president of the Royal Institute of British Architects (RIBA) from 1937 to 1939.

He was appointed a CBE in 1955.

Although he was a good 25 years older than Michael Noble, later Baron Glenkinglas, the two had a friendly feud based on the much nastier Andrew Noble - George Whitwick Rendel feud.

Works
1924: Nicholas Hawksmoor 
1932: Vitruvian Nights 
1934: Fine Art 
1937: Hatchlands, Surrey 
1938: Architecture in a Changing World
1947: How Architecture is Made 
1953: English Architecture Since the Regency
The Goodhart-Rendel Index of 19th century church builders, a card index which he compiled is held in the British Architectural Library, London.

Buildings

Eton Manor Boys' Club, Riseholme Street, London E9 (1912 demolished 1969)
St Olaf House, London (1928–32)
St Wilfrid's Church, Brighton (1932–34), now converted into residential apartments
Princes House, Brighton (1935–36)
Queen Elizabeth Hospital for Children, Banstead Wood, Surrey (1948)
St John the Evangelist's Church, St Leonards-on-Sea (rebuilding after war damage, 1951)
Friary Church of St Francis and St Anthony, Crawley (1955–59)
Sacred Heart Church, Cobham, Surrey (1958)
 Our Lady of the Rosary, Marylebone
 Several houses in the Surrey village of East Clandon were built to his drawings including Antler's Corner, Appletree Cottage, Meadow Cottage and 5 School Lane (1910), Prospect Cottages (1914), Snelgate Cottages (1926) and the St Thomas' Housing Society Cottages (1947)
Goodhart-Rendel designed a cover for the organ at the Royal Chapel of All Saints in Windsor Great Park.               
 St Martin and St Ninian Catholic Church, George St, Whithorn, Wigtownshire, Galloway, Scotland, 1959-60.  His only known building in Scotland. The interior has seen some reordering with the moving forward of the altar from the East wall after the Second Vatican Council. At that time the baldacchino was also removed, together with some decorative ironwork. The East elevation has a carved Hew Lorimer crucifix mounted to wall.

Family
His father was Harry Chester Goodhart (1858–1895), a former international footballer who became professor of Latin at the University of Edinburgh. His mother was Hon. Rose Ellen Rendel, the daughter of Stuart Rendel, 1st Baron Rendel, from whom in 1945 he inherited a substantial estate including Hatchlands Park which he subsequently made over to the National Trust.

Notes

Sources

External links
The Clandons: a look into the past (includes "The last squire of East Clandon", by Maurice Wiggin
 St Olaf House, Tooley Street

1887 births
1959 deaths
20th-century English architects
People educated at Eton College
Alumni of Trinity College, Cambridge
People from Cambridge
Presidents of the Royal Institute of British Architects
Slade Professors of Fine Art (University of Oxford)
Architects from Cambridgeshire
Architects from London
Grenadier Guards officers
British Army personnel of World War I
British Army personnel of World War II